Sherwood Hayes Rideout (July 17, 1917 – May 29, 1964) was a Canadian politician, who represented the electoral district of Westmorland from 1962 until his death in 1964. Prior to his election to the House of Commons of Canada, he was the mayor of the City of Moncton. During World War 2, Rideout acted as a train-master and was considered a key figure in the management of the train system and logistics planning that allowed vehicles, supplies and troop transports to be shipped through Moncton (known as the Hub City) to the port in Halifax.

A Liberal, he was elected in the 1962 election. Following his death from a heart attack, on a train bound for Moncton from Ottawa, he was succeeded by his widow Margaret, the first woman from New Brunswick to be elected to the House of Commons. Their son George also served in the House of Commons in the 1990s.

References

External links
 

1917 births
1964 deaths
Liberal Party of Canada MPs
Members of the House of Commons of Canada from New Brunswick
Mayors of Moncton